Do Dehak (also Romanized as Dow Dehak, Dūdehak, and Dūdhak) is a village in Do Dehak Rural District, in the Central District of Delijan County, Markazi Province, Iran. At the 2006 census, its population was 849 in  families.

References 

Populated places in Delijan County